John Supple (ca 1810 – 1869) was an Ontario businessman and political figure. He represented Renfrew North in the 1st Parliament of Ontario as a Conservative member from 1867 to 1869.

He was born in Ireland around 1810. Supple was a lumber merchant in the Pembroke area and a director of the Upper Ottawa Steamboat Company. He was elected in an 1856 by-election to represent Renfrew in the Legislative Assembly of the Province of Canada and was elected to represent Renfrew North in the provincial legislature after Confederation. His former estate is now the site of the city hall in Pembroke.

External links 

The Canadian parliamentary companion HJ Morgan (1869)

1869 deaths
Members of the Legislative Assembly of the Province of Canada from Canada West
Pre-Confederation Canadian businesspeople
Progressive Conservative Party of Ontario MPPs
Irish emigrants to pre-Confederation Ontario
People from Pembroke, Ontario
Year of birth uncertain
Immigrants to Upper Canada
1810 births